Urophora digna is a species of tephritid or fruit flies in the genus Urophora of the family Tephritidae.

Distribution
Mongolia.

References

Urophora
Insects described in 1975
Diptera of Asia